Celaenorrhinus perlustris, commonly known as the less illustrious sprite, is a species of butterfly in the family Hesperiidae. It is found in Nigeria, and eastwards through Cameroon, the Democratic Republic of the Congo and Uganda to Tanzania. The habitat consists of swampy areas in dense forests.

Subspecies
Celaenorrhinus perlustris perlustris (eastern Democratic Republic of the Congo, western Uganda, north-western Tanzania)
Celaenorrhinus perlustris katangensis Berger, 1976 (Democratic Republic of the Congo: south to Shaba)
Celaenorrhinus perlustris mona Evans, 1937 (Nigeria: the Cross River loop, Cameroon)

References

Butterflies described in 1914
perlustris